Peter Deer (November 26, 1878 in Kahnawake, Quebec – July 30, 1956) was a Canadian track and field athlete who competed in the 1904 Summer Olympics in the men's 1500 metres. He finished in 6th place. He also competed in the men's 800 metres.

References

External links

1878 births
1956 deaths
Olympic track and field athletes of Canada
Canadian male middle-distance runners
Athletes (track and field) at the 1904 Summer Olympics
Sportspeople from Quebec
Place of death missing